The Instituto Federal de Educação, Ciência e Tecnologia da Bahia (IFBA) (Bahia Federal Institute of Education, Science and Technology) is an institution that offers high and professional educations by having a pluricurricular form. It is a multicampi institution, especialized in offering professional and technological education in different areas of knowledge (biologics/human sciences/exact sciences).

The  Instituto Federal de Educação, Ciência e Tecnologia da Bahia (IFBA) (Bahia Federal Institute of Education, Science and Technology) is a federal institution, public, directly vinculated to the Ministry of Education of Brazil.

See also
Federal University of Bahia
IFET

References

Universities and colleges in Bahia
Educational institutions established in 1910
Bahia
1910 establishments in Brazil